Cheris F. Hodges (born 1977) is an African-American author of romance novels and a freelance journalist.

Hodges graduated from Johnson C. Smith University in 1999 with a degree in journalism. She lives in Charlotte, North Carolina. Hodges has previously written for Creative Loafing Charlotte and is also a winner of the North Carolina Press Association's community journalism award.

Awards
 North Carolina Press Association's community journalism award

Selected novels 

 Betting on Love (2009)
 More Than He Can Handle (2009)
 His Sexy Bad Habit (2011)
 Too Hot for TV (2011)
 Recipe for Desire (2012)
 Forces of Nature (2013)
 Love After War (2013)
 Rumor Has It (2015)
 I Heard a Rumor (2015)
 Deadly Rumors (2017)
 The Perfect Present (2017)
 Strategic Seduction (2018)

References 

Living people
1977 births
21st-century American novelists
American romantic fiction writers
African-American women writers
African-American novelists
Women romantic fiction writers
American women novelists
Johnson C. Smith University alumni
21st-century American women writers
21st-century American journalists
21st-century African-American women
21st-century African-American people
20th-century African-American people
20th-century African-American women